Busch Gardens Williamsburg (formerly known as Busch Gardens Europe and Busch Gardens: The Old Country) is a  amusement park in James City County near Williamsburg, Virginia, United States. It opened on May 16, 1975, adjacent to Anheuser-Busch's brewery and near its other developments, including the Kingsmill Resort complex.

The park is themed to various European country themes and was initially named Busch Gardens: The Old Country. In 1993, the park was renamed Busch Gardens Williamsburg and briefly named Busch Gardens Europe from 2006 to 2008. In 2015, an estimated 2.78 million guests attended the park, ranking it twentieth in overall attendance among amusement parks in North America. In addition to its landscaping and European themes, Busch Gardens is widely known for its roller coasters, including Griffon, Verbolten, Pantheon,  Alpengeist, and Apollo's Chariot, the latter of which was ranked as the fourth-best steel coaster in the annual Golden Ticket Awards publication from Amusement Today in 2012.

History
Beginning in the early 1970s, the Busch Gardens theme park was developed by Anheuser-Busch (A-B) as a portion of the company's development investment in the Williamsburg area, which grew to include a brewery, the Kingsmill Resort, and residential and office properties. It opened  in 1975 as Busch Gardens: The Old Country.

The St. Louis-based brewer invested in the area following negotiations held between August Busch, II and Winthrop Rockefeller, who was the governor of Arkansas and the chairman of Colonial Williamsburg in the 1960s and 1970s. (Water Country USA, a local water park, was acquired by A-B in the 1990s, and added to the company's theme park activities, which include a number of SeaWorld properties in other states as well.)

In the last part of the 20th and early into the 21st century, as a brewer, A-B found itself competing in an increasingly global market. In 2008, after initially resisting an unsolicited stock bid, A-B announced it had reached an agreement to be acquired by the even larger Belgium-based InBev. The newer owners announced plans to sell off the portions of A-B activities that were not part of the core beverage business as it worked to reduce the debt incurred to fund the acquisition.

The Blackstone Group was selected in late 2009 to acquire and operate the 10 former A-B theme parks, including two in the Williamsburg area. In July 2010, the adjacent Kingsmill Resort was scheduled to be acquired by Xanterra Parks and Resorts, a company owned by Denver-based Phillip Anschutz.

By mid-March 2020, the COVID-19 pandemic delayed the opening of the park for the 2020 season. The park remained closed until August 6, 2020, when they reopened, offering an all-new special event - Coasters and Craft Brews. The all-new special event featured limited capacity, required advanced reservations and temperature screening of guests upon arrival, and select villages of the park. As the pandemic progressed, the park has continued to host limited-capacity special events, including Taste of Busch Gardens Williamsburg, Halloween Harvest (in place of Howl-O-Scream), Christmas Celebration (in place of Christmas Town), Winter Weekends, and Mardi Gras.

Beginning in January 2021, the park began its year-round operation. The previous operating season of Busch Gardens Williamsburg was late March through early January. The Winter Weekends and Mardi Gras limited-capacity events are the first time that the park has ever been open during the winter months.

Overview of features
The park features a combination of roller coasters and Broadway-style shows. The park is broken into "countries", each having its unique style of food and music. The rides in the sections of the park are also themed to the country that they are located in.

Conservation
Jack Hanna's Wild Reserve houses a variety of wild species including gray wolves and bald eagles. Busch Gardens is partnered with SeaWorld (also owned by SeaWorld Parks & Entertainment) in the SeaWorld & Busch Gardens Conservation Fund, which offers guests the opportunity to contribute to wildlife conservation. The Rhine River Cruise's boats are battery-powered to cut back on power generation and prevent water pollution. In addition, Busch Gardens and Water Country USA both use insects rather than pesticides in the parks' commitment to organic gardening. All brochures, maps, show guides and paper products are made from recycled material.

Howl-O-Scream

Howl-O-Scream, the park's signature Halloween event, began in 1999 and offers more than a dozen (12) attractions featuring vampires, zombies, clowns, witches, and skeletons.

Christmas Town
Christmas Town is the park's Christmas event that began during the 2009 season. Several Christmas and winter holiday-themed attractions and shows are showcased, including a  Christmas tree called "O Tannenbaum" that lights up in sync to Christmas music in the Oktoberfest hamlet of the park. Each of the show venues from the summer season has a holiday-themed show during Christmas Town, ranging from reinterpretations of classic Christmas stories (Scrooge No More) to ice skating (Twas That Night on Ice), to a cappella performances (Gift of Harmony). Many of the flat rides are in operation as well as the park's train, skyride, and (weather permitting) a few roller coasters, which have traditionally been Verbolten, InvadR and Pantheon since their 2012, 2017, and 2022 opening seasons, respectively, and recently Apollo's Chariot, though previous Christmas town seasons saw Tempesto, Griffon, and Alpengeist also operate. During the celebration, the park is decorated with millions of lights and dozens of real Christmas trees. Shopping and dining are also a prominent part of Christmas Town, with many of the park's restaurants offering food and drinks catered to the season and colder weather. The event usually starts the weekend before Thanksgiving and continues every weekend until the week before Christmas, where it stays open for the rest of December until a few days after New Year's Day.

Hamlets

The park is separated into 10 different hamlets themed to European villages from England, France, Germany, Italy, Scotland and Ireland.

Two attractions provide transportation around the park. The Aeronaut Skyride gondola lift transports guests between the Sesame Street Forest of Fun, Aquitaine, and Rhinefeld hamlets; while the Busch Gardens Railway's replica steam trains transport guests between the Heatherdowns, Festa Italia and New France hamlets. The train serves as a convenient way for families with small children to travel around the park together as well as providing an "Old Country" themed method of transportation fitting the park's overall theme.

Banbury Cross (England)

Banbury Cross is fashioned after England, with phone booths and classic English architecture. Guest Services windows are located next to the turnstiles of the Main gate. A simulacrum of the famous Elizabeth Tower (Big Ben) is the central element of this area. Banbury Cross also includes The Squire's Grill, serving breakfast and lunch, as well as a funnel cake shop, ice cream shop and candy store. The Globe Theatre, a double-sized replica of William Shakespeare's Globe Theatre, is the most prominent attraction in the area. In 2014, the theatre was renovated for the purpose of once again holding live performances. For many years preceding 2014, the Globe Theatre's entertainment lineup consisted of 4-D films, including Haunts of the Old Country, Pirates 4-D and R.L. Stine's Haunted Lighthouse. Prior to the 4-D films, the theater hosted a variety of live shows including Mark Wilson's World's Greatest Illusions, America on Ice, Hot Ice, Celebrate America and the People's Choice. It currently features a Sesame Street live show, with performers in costume as popular characters.

Heatherdowns (Scotland)

Heatherdowns is a Scottish hamlet situated at the top of the hill on the path leading from Banbury Cross (the park's English hamlet). Tweedside Train Station offers a 20-minute ride through the park with additional stops in Festa Italia and at Caribou Station, in New France. Tweedside Gifts is located adjacent to the train station. Heatherdowns is also home to the Highland Stables featuring Scottish Blackface sheep, Border Collies and Clydesdales. Guests can interact with the animals and see them in action as they demonstrate their skills during daily demonstrations. Guests can also have pictures with the Clydesdales. Prior to 2010, the stables were home to several of the Anheuser-Busch Clydesdales until the theme park unit of Anheuser-Busch was sold in 2009. Other points of interest include seasonal kiosks for the park's Food and Wine Festival (in late spring) and the Summer Nights festival.
 Loch Ness Monster – A looping Arrow Development roller coaster. It was the first and the only remaining roller coaster in the world to feature interlocking loops.

Sesame Street Forest of Fun
Opened on April 3, 2009, Sesame Street Forest of Fun features four new children and family rides and attractions themed to Sesame Street, including a Zierer junior roller coaster named Grover's Alpine Express, Bert and Ernie's Loch Adventure flume ride, Oscar's Whirly Worms rock-n-tug-type ride, Prince Elmo's Spire shot-n-drop ride a small drop tower and wet and dry play areas. The area also features a stage for the main show "Sunny Days Celebration" and a gift shop. The hamlet also contains the Skyride station nearest to the Main Gate. The Aeronaut (first leg) of the Skyride departs to Aquitaine, France, while the Zeppelin (third leg) Skyride arrives from Rhinefeld, Germany.
 Bert and Ernie's Loch Adventure – A flat flume ride with water effects
 Oscar's Whirly Worms – A rocking, spinning Rockin' Tug ride
 Prince Elmo's Spire – A family-friendly shot-n-drop drop tower ride from Zamperla
 Grover's Alpine Express – A Zierer family-friendly roller coaster standing 24 feet tall

Killarney (Ireland)

Formerly known as Hastings, England, this section of the park was re-themed in 2001 as Ireland, the newest country in over 20 years. This area features Celtic Fyre, at the Abbey Stone Theatre, a celebration of Irish dance. Previously, the theatre housing Celtic Fyre was named the Magic Lantern Theatre and housed some of the best theme park musical revue in the United States. Shows such as Kaleidoscope, Hats Off to Hollywood, Journey into Music, Stage Struck, Totally Television and Rockin the Boat are some of the names of these productions. Grogan's Grill offers Irish cuisine in this area.

Outside the gateway next to Castle O'Sullivan, the walkway makes a sharp left turn and begins a long, moderately steep climb toward Aquitaine, France. Several animal sanctuaries and two animal performance theaters are situated along this path. Originally named Jack Hanna's Wild Reserve when it opened in 2000, the animal sanctuary was considered its own section of the park, but in 2017 the Wild Reserve was merged with Killarney and renamed the Jack Hanna Trail.
 Finnegan's Flyer – S&S Screamin' Swing opened in the spring of 2019. The ride swings guests at 100 feet at 45 mph.
 Eagle Ridge & Wolf Valley – Animal exhibits located just outside the village.
 Pet Shenanigans Theater – An outdoor venue that currently hosts the More Pet Shenanigans show.
 Lorikeet Glen – A covered bird sanctuary for Lorikeets and other brightly colored birds. Guests can enter and the birds will approach and land on them.

San Marco (Italy)

When Italy/San Marco was opened, it completed the outer circle walkway around Busch Gardens. Part of the park's expansion included a high pedestrian bridge across the Rhine River into Oktoberfest, Germany. San Marco is based upon Renaissance era Italy. A prominent feature within San Marco is Da Vinci's Garden of Inventions. This garden features Italian statues and flowers set amid rides based on sketches by Leonardo da Vinci. Also in the area is Ristorante Della Piazza, featuring Italian cuisine and allowing guests to watch "Mix It Up." During the summer until 2008, sounds of the Starlight Orchestra could be heard while dining.
 Escape from Pompeii – A shoot-the-chutes boat ride featuring an extensive indoor portion within the city of Pompeii, featuring fire and water effects as well as falling statues to simulate the destruction of the city.
 Little Gliders & Little Balloons – Family-sized carnival rides themed to Da Vinci's inventions.
 The Battering Ram – A high-capacity, high-thrill swinging ship. This does not go upside down.
 The Flying Machine – A lightly themed Tivoli manufactured orbiter ride that spins riders.

Festa Italia (Italy)
Festa Italia is themed around a fair celebrating Marco Polo's return to Italy from his famous visit to China. It contains many of the park's midway games, all with a festival theme. Its attractions are themed around Roman mythology.
 Apollo's Chariot – A Bolliger & Mabillard Hyper Coaster featuring dives towards and around ponds and hills. Apollo's Chariot also features a deep purple and gold color scheme which is easily visible from the park entrance and surrounding parking lots.
 Roman Rapids – A circular-raft rapids ride among Roman ruins, which is deliberately designed to drench guests.
 Tradewinds – A permanent-placement music express ride.
 Elephant Run – Another child-friendly music express ride.
 Turkish Delight – A variation of a teacups ride.
 Tempesto – A Premier Rides steel roller coaster featuring three launches, a heartline roll, and going about 60 mph backward and forwards.
 Pantheon – An Intamin multi-launch coaster.
Festa Italia also includes the Festa Train Station of the Busch Gardens Railway.

Rhinefeld (Rhineland Germany)

This section is based on the country of Germany. It is largely themed to a runaway ski resort in the German Alps. The third leg of Busch Gardens' Skyride arrives and departs from this section. Also, in Rhinefeld is Land of the Dragons, a large children's play area featuring a playground, five rides, and seasonal shows can be found.
 Alpengeist – A Bolliger & Mabillard inverted roller coaster, Alpengeist is themed to a ski-lift taken over by a local legend, the Alpengeist (Ghost of the Alps). In addition to its green and white Alpine color scheme, the station of Alpengeist features ski gear and other decorations to simulate a ski lodge in the Alps. This ride inverts riders six times.
 Kinder Karussel – The park's antique Herschell Carousel.
 Land of the Dragons – Interactive children's play area featuring a treehouse, children's rides and a Ferris wheel.

Land of the Dragons
When it opened in 1994 (replacing the former Grimms Hollow children's area), Land of the Dragons was the main kiddie area at Busch Gardens. It is home to Dumpherey the Dragon, the area's mascot. Other major notes taken to Land of the Dragons includes its dragon-themed 3-story tree house, a wet play area with waterfalls, squirting geysers, and a serpent that inhabits the area. There are also smaller play zones, smaller wet play areas and (formerly) a gift shop called Dragon Digs. 
 Flutter Splutter – A flying dragon ride
 Chug-A-Tug – A boat ride
 Bug-A-Dug – A music express-like ride with ladybug cars that are red and yellow
 Dragon-themed Treehouse
 Brook – A wet play area

As of the 2012 season, the Lost Children building has been relocated from its former building, dubbed Wild Moose Lodge, in New France, to what was formerly the Dragon Digs gift shop.

Oktoberfest (Bavarian Germany)

Like Rhinefeld, this section is based on Germany during the annual celebration of Oktoberfest. Oktoberfest features many of the park's flat rides. It is also home to a large assortment of carnival-style games. Das Festhaus is a large, air-conditioned eating facility where guests can purchase German food or American classics. While eating in Das Festhaus, guests can experience shows that rotate throughout the year. This section of the park formerly hosted The Big Bad Wolf, a suspended roller coaster. The Big Bad Wolf was closed on September 7, 2009.

On September 18, 2010, it was announced that in 2011, Oktoberfest would be renovated with new shops and sights, including a new beer garden and pretzel shop known as Beste Brezeln und Bier with a Bavarian maypole occupying the flower garden in front of Das Festhaus, and a  drop tower called Mäch Tower. Also announced was a new "multi-launch" roller coaster that opened in the spring of 2012 on the former site of the Big Bad Wolf. In September 2011 it was announced that the new coaster would be called Verbolten. On May 18, 2012, Verbolten officially opened to the general public.

The area also hosts a large part of the annual BierFest festival, which features a large number of beers from around the world, with at least 22 different beers on tap throughout the whole area. German-themed food and non-alcoholic beverages are also sold during the festival.

The area also contained the trackless dark ride Curse of DarKastle. The attraction opened on May 1, 2005, and closed on September 4, 2017, to make way for a temporary Howl-O-Scream maze, Frostbite. On January 23, 2018, it was announced that Curse of DarKastle would not reopen for the 2018 season and would be officially closing for being a burden with maintenance costs. The building that harbored the dark ride was used as event space, such as Santa's workshop for Christmas Town and a walkthrough maze for the 2021 Halloween event Howl-O-Scream. On September 6, 2022, it was announced that a new indoor launch coaster named DarKoaster: Escape The Storm would open in the space during Spring 2023.
 Der Autobahn (Bumper Cars)
 Der Autobahn Jr. (Kiddie Bumper Cars)
 Der Roto Baron (Red Baron)
 Der Wirbelwind (Waveswinger) – classic yo-yo swings ride
 DarKoaster: Escape The Storm(Indoor Straddle Coaster)
 Verbolten – Brave The Black Forest – A family-style, Black Forest themed launched roller coaster with a top speed of 53 mph. It also has a free fall when the track drops vertically while staying on a horizontal plane.

Aquitaine (France)

This section, centered on the village of Aquitaine, is based on Belle Époque France. It is home to many boutiques and one of the park's Skyride stations, where the first leg of the Skyride arrives from England and the second leg departs for Rhinefeld, Germany. The Royal Palace Theatre in France hosts numerous shows throughout the season.
 Griffon – A dive roller coaster, named after the legendary creature, the griffin; contains a ninety-degree drop from 205 feet, 2 Immelmann loops, and a "splashdown" finale; the brother ride of Busch Gardens Tampa Bay's SheiKra. Year Opened: 2007

New France (French Colonial Canada)

New France presents a unique shopping experience that showcases the French colonial influence in Canada, featuring a range of stores with merchandise that complements the overall colonial theme. Rides in New France include the Busch Gardens Railway departing from Caribou Station and the Le Scoot Log Flume, featuring a  plunge through a sawmill. A predominant feature in this area is the Trappers Smokehouse, which has an outdoor grill centrally located. Trappers Smokehouse offers grilled and smoked items such as chicken, turkey legs, ribs, and beef brisket.
 Le Scoot Log Flume – A traditional high-in-the-sky theme park log flume
 Le Catapult – a basic carnival scrambler
 InvadR – a Great Coasters International wooden roller coaster opened in 2017. InvadR is themed around the Viking invasion of New France. It has 9 airtime hills, a 74-foot drop and goes up to 48 mph.

Roller coasters

Existing (listed by first year)

Defunct

Defunct rides and attractions

Animal attractions

Jack Hanna's Wild Reserve
Jack Hanna's Wild Reserve includes bald eagles and wolves. Eagle Ridge is a 3,000+ foot area set aside for housing and rehabilitating bald eagles and providing education to visitors. Wolf Haven is a viewing area where guests may observe one of Busch Garden's pairs of wolves. One pair is on exhibition at a time. Busch Gardens also provides Wolf Valley for those wolves not on display. Over  of natural habitat is intended to ensure the animals' health and well-being. It also contains an aviary named Lorikeet Glen, which displays Rainbow lorikeets, and other birds. The wild reserve is located in the Ireland section of the park. In recent years, animal attractions at the park have been extensively removed, though the staple attractions remain.

Highland Stables
Busch Gardens' Highland Stables features Scottish Blackface sheep, Border Collies, black Clydesdales and Highland cattle. Guests can interact with the animals during daily demonstrations. It is located between the England and Scotland sections.

Parking and transportation

At the park, special parking areas are provided for persons with disabilities, recreational vehicles and groups arriving by buses and motorcoaches. Trams provide shuttle service to and from entrance gates from outlying parking areas.

Within the park itself, three steam locomotive powered trains operate on the  narrow gauge Busch Gardens Railway, a  loop of track, providing transportation between the Heatherdowns, Festa Italia and New France themed areas. Additionally, a skyride provides transportation between the Banbury Cross, Aquitaine and Rhinefeld themed areas.

Awards and recognition

Attendance (rounded)

Gallery

References

Sources
 Busch Gardens Williamsburg expansion announcement page
 Busch Gardens Williamsburg official website
 Busch Gardens Williamsburg Howl-o-Scream official website
 Busch Gardens Williamsburg Christmas Town official website

External links

 

 
1975 establishments in Virginia
Amusement parks in Virginia
Buildings and structures in James City County, Virginia
Landmarks in Virginia
SeaWorld Parks & Entertainment
Tourist attractions in James City County, Virginia
Amusement parks opened in 1975